Günther Noack (24 December 1912 in Budapest — 3 May 1991 in Biberach an der Riß)  was a German figure skater who competed in pair skating.

With partner Inge Koch, he won bronze medals at two World Figure Skating Championships (in 1938 and 1939) and two European Figure Skating Championships (also in 1938 and 1939).

Competitive highlights 
With Inge Koch

With Gerda Strauch

References 

German male pair skaters
1912 births
1991 deaths
20th-century German people